Bradley Witt (born 1952) is an American Democratic politician who is a current member of the Oregon House of Representatives for District 31, representing most of Columbia and parts of Clatsop and Multnomah counties, since his appointment in January 2005.

Witt was a candidate for the Democratic nomination for the special election in Oregon's 1st congressional district to replace David Wu, who resigned from Congress before the end of his term due to allegations of sexual misconduct. Witt lost in the Democratic primary to state senator Suzanne Bonamici.

References

External links
Oregon State House - Brad Witt official government website
Campaign website
Legislative website
Project Vote Smart - Representative Bradley 'Brad' Witt (OR) profile
Follow the Money - Brad Witt
2006 campaign contributions

1952 births
Living people
People from Ware, Massachusetts
Democratic Party members of the Oregon House of Representatives
People from Clatskanie, Oregon
21st-century American politicians